Franco Martín Muñoz Rodríguez (born 6 February 1999) is a Uruguayan footballer who plays as a midfielder for Juventud de Las Piedras in the Uruguayan Primera División.

Career

Juventud
Muñoz signed his first professional contract with the club in August 2017. He made his competitive debut for the club later on that year, coming on as a late substitute for Alejandro Reyes in a 3-2 defeat to Cerro.

Career statistics

Club

References

1999 births
Living people
Juventud de Las Piedras players
Uruguayan Primera División players
Uruguayan Segunda División players
Uruguayan footballers
Association football midfielders
People from Santa Lucía, Uruguay